Otonabee–South Monaghan is a township in central-eastern Ontario, Canada, in Peterborough County. The township, located along the Trent–Severn Waterway, was formed on January 1, 1998, through the amalgamation of Otonabee and South Monaghan Townships.

Communities
The township comprises the communities of Assumption, Bailieboro, Bensfort, Bensfort Bridge, Blezard, Cameron, Campbelltown, Drummond, Hall Landing, Indian River, Jermyn, Keene, Lang, Mathers Corners, Pengelley Landing, Pleasant Point, Stewart Hall, Villiers, Wallace Point, and Zion.

It has interesting shops, artisans, gardens, and history, with fishing and camping or resorts close at hand.

Geography
The main attraction in the area is the Serpent Mounds Campgrounds and Historical Site.  It has an effigy mound in the shape of a snake, constructed as an earthwork nearly 2,000 years ago by indigenous peoples of the Hopewell culture.  Formerly a Provincial Park, the government returned the site to the Hiawatha First Nation as a historically significant burial ground for the Indigenous people.

In addition to the mounds and campgrounds, the park also has a groomed beach for swimming and several kilometers of walking and biking trails. Another popular pastime in the area is fishing. Rice Lake is known to many as a great spot for some boating and fishing. There are also several resorts with water access points.

Education

Keene has a school of approximately 600 students called North Shore Public School. This school is the main elementary school for families in Keene, as well as those on outlying farms.  North Shore is a feeder school for Thomas A. Stewart Secondary School.

Transportation
The area is served by the small Keene/Elmhirst's Resort Airport and Keene/Elmhirst's Resort Water Aerodrome.

Attractions
Lang Pioneer Village Museum is a living history museum located in the hamlet of Lang.  Lang Pioneer Village is owned and operated by the County of Peterborough and is open to the public from approximately mid-May to mid-September.  In addition to the regular season, Lang Pioneer Village offers various education programs and hosts a number of popular special events throughout the summer and fall seasons.

The Lang-Hastings Trail is a 33 km rail trail that runs between Peterborough and Hastings, and passes through Keene and other areas. It is part of the Trans-Canada Trail, the longest trail build in the country.

Demographics 

Mother tongue:
 English as first language: 93.1%
 French as first language: 0.9%
 English and French as first language: 0%
 Other as first language: 6.0%

See also
List of townships in Ontario

References

External links 

Lower-tier municipalities in Ontario
Municipalities in Peterborough County
Township municipalities in Ontario
Populated places established in 1998
1998 establishments in Ontario